Condica capensis is a moth of the family Noctuidae. It is found across Africa, the Indian sub-continent and South-East Asia. In Europe, it is only common in southern Spain, but can be found further north.

Technical description and variation

Forewing fuscous on a rufous ground, dusted with grey along costa, below and beyond lower angle of cell, and along termen; the veins dark; inner and outer lines conversely lunulate-dentate, the teeth marked by black and white points, the lunules yellow; subterminal line whitish, dentate, preceded by small tooth shaped black spots; claviform stigma small, outlined in black; orbicular small, constricted in middle, the centre brown and ring pale; reniform with centre yellowish in upper half, white in lower, this lower lobe surrounded with small white dots outlined in black; hindwing dull white, the veins and termen suffused with brown, or wholly brown in female. Larva smooth, pale green, the anal segment humped; a series of purplish brown dorsal and lateral blotches dappled with white; a sublateral series of white dots; pupa greenish, with the segmental incisions reddish.  The wingspan is 28–36 mm.

Biology
The larvae feed on various herbaceous plants, including Carthamus tinctorius.

References

External links
Information about the host plant Carthamus tinctorius
hantsmoths

Condicinae
Moths of Cape Verde
Moths of Africa
Moths of Madagascar
Moths of the Middle East
Moths described in 1852